The Isaac Agree Downtown Synagogue is a synagogue located at 1457 Griswold Street in Detroit, Michigan.  As of 2014, it was the only congregationally-owned synagogue building still used as a synagogue within Detroit proper; however, the Reconstructionist Congregation of Detroit, an active Jewish congregation, conducts regular worship services at Christ Church Detroit.

The Isaac Agree Memorial Society was formed in 1921 by the Agree, Canvasser, Kaplan, Rosin and Zatkin families. The synagogue has gone through two periods where it did not own a permanent building. The congregation purchased its current location on Griswold Street and Clifford Street from the former Fyntex department store, marking its third home. In years past, the shul had hundreds of members, joined by Jewish businessmen visiting and working in the city. 600 worshipers attended the synagogue's High Holiday services in 2007, which were open to all.

As recently as 2000, the congregation drew 25 to 30 worshipers for Shabbat services on Saturday mornings. Rabbi Noah Gamze, who had been the synagogue's leader, died in 2003, and has not been replaced since.  The Shabbat morning prayer services are the only weekly scheduled services now offered by the synagogue, however, by 2014, the weekly offerings have expanded to include Thursday morning and Friday evening services.

Patrons and staff of a neighboring club have joined together to develop a plan to help revitalize the synagogue, hoping not just to save the building but to make it "a hub for the people returning to the city and the energy that represents", according to a member of the group. A contractor estimated that it would cost $450,000 to repair the building and convert the top two floors into live / work space, hoping to reach out to the young and educated people who are moving into the center city area. The group has approached the board with the proposal.

See also

 History of the Jews in Metro Detroit

References

External links
Isaac Agree Downtown Synagogue website

Jews and Judaism in Detroit
Jewish organizations established in 1921
Unaffiliated synagogues in the United States
Religious buildings and structures in Detroit
1921 establishments in Michigan